Sarvaghaji (also Romanized as Sarvāghājī; also known as Salīm Āghājī (Persian: سليم اغاجي), Salīm Āghāj, and Sāmbaghājī) is a village in Angut-e Gharbi Rural District, Anguti District, Germi County, Ardabil Province, Iran. At the 2006 census, its population was 528, in 95 families.

References 

Tageo

Towns and villages in Germi County